Cleveland Play House (CPH) is a professional regional theater company located in Cleveland, Ohio. It was founded in 1915 and built its own noted theater complex in 1927.  Currently the company performs at the Allen Theatre in Playhouse Square where it has been based since 2011.

Cleveland Play House is organized like most American theater companies, with a board of directors and a number of administrators. The Board of Directors is chaired by Anne Marie Warren. The Artistic Director is Laura Kepley. The Managing Director was Kevin Moore until his death in 2020. The theater's national directors are Alan Alda, Austin Pendleton, and Joel Grey.

The theatre received the 2015 Regional Theatre Tony Award on June 7, 2015 at Radio City Music Hall in New York City.

History

Origins

In the early 1900s Cleveland theatre featured mostly vaudeville, melodrama, burlesque and light entertainment.  In 1915 a select group of ten Clevelanders met in the home of Charles S. and Minerva Brooks to discuss the formation of an Art Theatre. Those present in addition to the Brooks were Walter and Julia McCune Flory, Raymond O'Neil, Ernest and Katharine Angell, Henry and Anna Hohnhorst, George Clisbee, Grace Treat, and Marthena Barrie.  Together, they formed Cleveland Play House and named O'Neil as the Director. Their initial productions were performed in a home donated by Cleveland industrialist Francis Drury located at East 85th and Euclid Avenue. O'Neil was a devotee of the artistic ideals of Edward Gordon Craig, and the Play House's earliest productions reflect this. The founders of the Play House were bohemians and suffragists, and were thus outsiders in conservative Cleveland society. As a result, the Play House in its early years performed for a select group of individuals interested in avant-garde art, rather than the larger community of Cleveland.

The Play House was founded midway through a decade of cultural renaissance in Cleveland.  Through a partnership of idealistic vision and philanthropic largess, many of Cleveland's major cultural organizations were formed between 1910 and 1920—Cleveland Music School Settlement, Karamu House, the Cleveland Museum of Art, the Cleveland Orchestra, the Cleveland Institute of Music and the Cleveland Museum of Natural History.

After moving through several facilities in its first two years, the Play House purchased and renovated a church at Cedar Avenue and East 73rd Street, and opened the Cedar Avenue Theatre in December 1917. The new facility seated 160 and marked a turn toward professionalism. Soon after this, the Play House began to struggle financially, and the Board of Directors became increasingly dissatisfied with Raymond O'Neil's leadership. The resulting arguments led to O'Neil's resignation in 1921. The Board subsequently hired Frederic McConnell as the next Director, along with his associates K. Elmo Lowe and Max Eisenstat as assistants. The three transformed CPH into a popular regional theatre, ushering in a long era of growth and prosperity.

A new Cleveland Play House facility, built in 1927, housed the Brooks Theatre and the Drury Theatre.  To accommodate its growth, CPH in 1949 opened the 77th Street Theatre in a converted church, which featured America's first open stage – the forerunner of the thrust stage that was popularized in the 1950s and 1960s.  In the 1980s, the 77th Street Theatre was closed, Cleveland Play House purchased the Sears building and the world-renowned architect Philip Johnson designed significant additions for the complex, including the Bolton Theatre.  With the 1927 buildings, the Sears building and the Johnson buildings taken together, the complex for CPH became the largest regional theatre complex in the country.

Recent history

In 2009, through a collaboration called "The Power of Three," CPH partnered with Playhouse Square and Cleveland State University to create the new Allen Theatre Complex in downtown Cleveland. In July 2009, CPH sold its building at 86th Street and Euclid Avenue to Cleveland Clinic. In September 2011, CPH kicked off its 96th consecutive season in the transformed Allen Theatre at Playhouse Square. Two new venues adjacent to the Allen Theatre came on board in January 2012, the Second Stage (renamed the Outcalt Theatre in 2014) and the Helen Rosenfeld Lewis Bialosky Lab Theatre. A new production center is now located along the lakeshore in Cleveland, and administrative offices and education center are on East 13th Street.

The list of plays and playwrights that have had premiers at Cleveland Play House is impressive, the most notable being Tennessee Williams' You Touched Me, and Bertolt Brecht's Mother Courage. Other notable premiers include The Pleasure of Honesty by Luigi Pirandello, Simone by Ben Hecht, Translations by Brian Friel, A Decent Birth by William Saroyan, Command by William Wister Haines, Ten Times Table by Alan Ayckbourn, The March on Russia by David Storey, The Archbishop's Ceiling by Arthur Miller, First Monday in October by Jerome Lawrence and Robert E. Lee, Lillian by William Luce, The Cemetery Club by Ivan Menchell, The Effect of Gamma Rays on Man-in-the-Moon Marigolds by Paul Zindel, Jerusalem by Seth Greenland, The Smell of the Kill by Michele Lowe, and Bright Ideas by Eric Coble. Cleveland Play House continues to have a strong commitment to new works, especially those written by Ohio playwrights. The current policy for submission of new plays only permits unsolicited works to be submitted by playwrights who currently reside in the state of Ohio.

At least one mainstage production in each season is a new play.

Playwrights' Unit
The Playwrights' Unit is a group of experienced, accomplished playwrights from the Cleveland area who receive creative and administrative support from Cleveland Play House. The Unit meets regularly with members of the CPH artistic staff, where they read their works-in-progress and provide each other with feedback. Many of the plays developed in the Playwrights' Unit have been produced by Cleveland Play House, other Cleveland area theatres, and across the United States. Admission into the Playwrights' Unit is by invitation. Currently the CPH Playwrights' Unit consists of Eric Coble, Michael Geither, David Hansen, Margaret Lynch, Deborah Magid, Michael Oatman & Eric Schmiedl.

Master of Fine Arts Program

Founded in 1996, the MFA program at Cleveland Play House is affiliated with Case Western Reserve University and has a growing national reputation, having produced many successful graduates. The master's degree for actors is a three-year program with a new class beginning study every other year. Tuition is waived, and an annual living stipend is awarded to each student automatically. The most notable graduate to date is Rich Sommer (class of 2004), who is featured on the AMC series Mad Men and had a recurring role on NBC's The Office. Elizabeth A. Davis (class of 2006), was nominated for a Tony for her performance in Once. During the students' third year in the program, they are engaged on an Actors' Equity contract in a Cleveland Play House main stage production. Students conclude their studies by performing in an agent showcase in New York. During their term of study, the students are also cast in readings and other smaller productions. Each year of study focuses on a different area and period of theatre, as well as a cumulative study of voice, movement, and technique. Cleveland Play House teaches pre-K to MFA so children can start learning and developing skills when they are young.

New Ground Theatre Festival
New Ground Theatre Festival (formerly known as FusionFest) is an annual showcase of new theatrical works. Cleveland Play House develops and presents a variety of new work from nationally recognized artists, and each year produces a centerpiece production. Other offerings range from fully produced large-scale collaborations with peer top-tier organizations to solo performances to readings of plays hot off the writer's printer. The Roe Green Award brings a leading American playwright to Cleveland to develop a new project culminating in a public reading and master class. The first winner of this prestigious award was Pulitzer Prize winning playwright Quiara Alegría Hudes, who spent a week in-residency with CPH to present and discuss her play Daphne's Dive in May 2012.

Cleveland Play House has showcased many playwrights and their emerging work at New Ground Theatre Festival, including Jordan Harrison (Marjorie Prime, 2013), George Brant (Grounded, 2014), Elizabeth A. Davis (Joe, 2014), Kirsten Greenidge (Little Roe Boat or, Conjecture, 2016), and Eric Coble(Fairfield, 2014, Feed 2016, These Mortal Hosts, 2017).

Notable artists
Alan Alda, Joel Grey, Margaret Hamilton, Paul Newman, Elizabeth Hartman, Eleanor Parker, June Squibb, Ray Walston, Jack Weston, Grant Show and James Riordan are among the many actors whose careers began at the Play House which also operates the nation's oldest community-based-theatre-education programs.

Artistic directors

Recent productions

2018–2019 season

2017–2018 season

2016–2017 season

2015–2016 (100th anniversary) season

2014–2015 season

References in pop culture
In the movie Wet Hot American Summer, when upset about the effort of the actors in a camp play, Amy Poehler as "Susie" says:
"OK, stop. I feel like I'm watching regional theatre, you guys. God! Am I in the Cleveland Play House or something? Your craft is a muscle, you need to exercise it. Take a break; think about what you've done."

Filmmaker David Wain explained, "The joke was that in saying how bad these campers are, she compares them to a truly respected theater company.  I figured why not make a reference to my hometown?"

References

External links

 Cleveland Play House

Theatres in Cleveland
Entertainment companies established in 1915
1915 establishments in Ohio
Philip Johnson buildings